Michael William Gatting  (born 6 June 1957) is an English former cricketer, who played first-class cricket for Middlesex (1975–1998; captain 1983–1997) and for England from 1977 to 1995, captaining the national side in twenty-three Test matches between 1986 and 1988. He toured South Africa as captain of the rebel tour party in 1990.

He replaced John Buchanan as the county coach, serving during 1999 and 2000.

He is currently an elected member of the Middlesex C.C.C. Executive Board and the M.C.C. Committee. He has previously served as the ECB managing director of Cricket Partnerships and President of Marylebone Cricket Club

Cricket writer Colin Bateman has stated that "talk of Gatting the batsman always evokes adjectives such as pugnacious, bold, brave and belligerent".

Youth career 
As a youngster, Gatting became first batsman to score a century on Youth ODI debut in 1976. He scored 126 runs in that innings against the West Indies U19's.

Career
Before playing cricket professionally, Gatting used to play football for Watford reserves. As a fourteen-year-old goalkeeper on trial at Queen's Park Rangers, Gatting was told that he was too short and overweight to make the grade. Gatting also went on an unfruitful trial with fellow Londoners Arsenal F.C. That being so, he turned to cricket for his sporting future and QPR signed the other trialist that day, Phil Parkes.

In domestic cricket, Gatting was one of the most prolific batsmen in England for most of his career, but it took him several years to establish himself in the England team. He initially had great difficulty converting fifties into centuries at Test match level and he did not achieve a Test century until his fifty-fourth Test innings; he went on to accumulate ten hundreds in all. His highest Test score of 207 was scored in Madras.  Graeme Fowler also scored a double century in the same innings; it remains the only occasion where two English batsmen scored double centuries in the same innings of a test match. Gatting later captained England to an Ashes series victory in Australia in 1986/87.

During a one-day match in 1986, Gatting's nose was shattered by a ferocious delivery from West Indies fast bowler Malcolm Marshall. Marshall later found shards of the nose embedded in the ball's leather. The incident set the tone for the series as the West Indies' fearsome pace attack spearheaded England's thrashing 5–0.

Another mishap for which Gatting will be remembered is being caught by Australian wicketkeeper Greg Dyer, after trying to play a reverse sweep off opposing captain Allan Border's first ball during the 1987 World Cup final.

In 1987, Gatting gained notoriety in the "Shakoor Rana affair" when he argued with umpire Shakoor Rana in Faisalabad. He was accused of adjusting the field illegally, i.e. after the bowler had started running in, and warned. In fact, Gatting had been signalling to the long leg fielder to stop walking in, and the move was legal as it was not in the batsman's eyeline. Rana shouted 'stop, stop' and signalled dead ball, however, infuriating Gatting. Tempers were already frayed following a string of umpiring decisions that had gone against England, and the England team were unhappy that Rana was wearing a Pakistan sweater under his jacket. An on-pitch argument ensued, during the course of which Rana accused Gatting of breaking the rules and Gatting shouted 'We made the rules'. He had to be dragged away by Bill Athey. Rana refused to resume the match the following morning until Gatting delivered a handwritten apology, which he did under protest – eventually, the match was drawn due to bad light. The England hierarchy supported him, flying officials out to mediate with the board and deal with press relations. The Pakistan board supported Rana, naming him umpire for the deciding Test, from which position they only backed down when it was clear the England team would not play if Rana officiated, naming two other umpires. Indeed, the TCCB subsequently paid all players in the England party a £1000 'hardship' bonus for the tour.

Martin Williamson, editor of Cricinfo, subsequently commented of the incident, 'Whatever the provocation, Gatting was in the wrong.'  Gatting also reflected later that 'it wasn't a very proud moment of my career.' He also admitted that, whatever the official reason given, it was the real reason why he lost the England captaincy the following summer. However, it went a long way towards establishing the principle of the superiority of the umpire over the players, which had not always been the case previously, and Rana said he did it 'for umpires everywhere'.

Gatting was sacked as England captain the following summer over an alleged encounter with a barmaid, triggering the "summer of four captains". He subsequently led a highly controversial rebel tour to South Africa. Gatting hit the headlines during the tour for describing a protest outside the rebel team's hotel as "a few people singing and dancing". The rebels received three-year international bans. 

In June 1993, during England's first innings at Old Trafford, Gatting received Shane Warne's first delivery – now known as the "Ball of the Century" – in an Ashes match. Warne pitched the ball a foot outside leg stump and spun the ball past Gatting's bat to clip the off bail. Gatting's dismissal in the second innings was also unusual, in that he was bowled off the very last ball of the fourth day's play by Merv Hughes, meaning he was unable to help England bat out the last day. Australia went on to win during the last session on that last day.

Gatting's last Tests were played on tour in Australia in 1994/95. Graham Gooch and himself were the only two members of the original touring party to be fit for all matches, although they were the two oldest in the squad. In the first innings of the Adelaide Test he scored his final century (117), a battling effort where he spent a lot of time in the nineties. His score helped England to their only win in the series.

Gatting was a useful right arm medium pace bowler. He averaged under thirty with the ball in both first-class and List A cricket, but he did not bowl with great frequency in International cricket. Perhaps his finest bowling performance was against South Africa during the final One Day International of the 1989/90 rebel England tour to South Africa where his 6/26 helped England to a comfortable 134-run victory.

Gatting was named as one of Wisden's five Cricketers of the Year in 1984. In 1987, he was awarded an OBE.

Retirement

He retired from first-class cricket in 1998 and has since worked as a coach and commentator. He is also a Past President of the Lord's Taverners for 2005–06 and the Marylebone Cricket Club (MCC) for 2013–14. He is currently in his second term as an elected member of the MCC committee and is also a co-opted member of the Middlesex C.C.C. Executive Board. Since October 2017 he has been the chairman of MCC's World Cricket committee.

Mike Gatting is not the only member of his family to have been a professional sportsman; his brother, Steve Gatting, was a professional footballer for Arsenal and Brighton & Hove Albion. Steve's son, Joe, played for Brighton & Hove Albion, having progressed from their youth scheme, and later played professional cricket for Sussex and Hampshire between 2009 and 2015.

He appeared as himself on The Archers on 9 September 2007 at the centre of a misunderstanding between Sid and Jolene Perks during the npower Village Cup Final at Lord's.

In May 2013, it was announced that he would be the President of Marylebone Cricket Club and helm it during bicentenary of Lord's and also Middlesex will celebrate the 150th anniversary of its formation. 

Gatting Way, the road in Uxbridge that leads from Park Road to the Uxbridge Cricket Club Ground, of which Middlesex County Cricket Club are tenants, is named  after Mike Gatting.

References

External links
 
 Elected to the Middlesex County Cricket Club Executive Board 8 July 2015

1957 births
Cricketers at the 1983 Cricket World Cup
Cricketers at the 1987 Cricket World Cup
England One Day International cricketers
England Test cricket captains
English cricket commentators
English cricketers of 1969 to 2000
Living people
Marylebone Cricket Club cricketers
Middlesex cricket captains
Middlesex cricket coaches
Officers of the Order of the British Empire
People from Kingsbury, London
Presidents of the Marylebone Cricket Club
Wisden Cricketers of the Year
Cricketers from Greater London
English cricketers
Middlesex cricketers
Test and County Cricket Board XI cricketers
D. B. Close's XI cricketers
Young England cricketers
England Test cricketers